Helge Rognlien (14 January 1920 – 15 July 2001) was a Norwegian politician for the Liberal Party.

He was born in Oslo. At the outbreak of World War II, Rognlien was a student at the University of Oslo. After the German occupation of Norway in 1940, he was a member of the new governing body of the Norwegian Students' Society, which included students from all political groups, except the National Socialists. Rognlien represented the Liberal Student Association. A troubled relationship with the Nazi regime ensued until 15 October 1943, when 63 prominent students were arrested, and Rognlien was one of them. After a time in Bredtveit and Berg concentration camps until 8 December 1943, he spent the rest of the war years in captivity in Sennheim in Alsace and Buchenwald concentration camp in Germany.

Having graduated as cand.jur. in 1945, his career began with a one-year tenure as civil servant in the Ministry of Justice and the Police. From 1946 to 1948 he was the leader of the Young Liberals of Norway, the youth wing of the Liberal Party.

On 29 August 1970 he was appointed Minister of Local Government during the centre-right cabinet Borten, replacing Helge Seip. Rognlien held the position until the cabinet Borten fell in 1971. In 1972 he again replaced Helge Seip, this time as party chairman of the Liberal Party. He held this position until 1974, when Eva Kolstad took over as the first female party leader in Norway.

Rognlien was a member of Bærum municipality council from 1955 to 1960 and 1967 to 1979, and also of Akershus county council from 1963 to 1975. He never served in the national parliament.

He was a member of the Norwegian Nobel Committee from 1966 to 1973.

References

1920 births
2001 deaths
Liberal Party (Norway) politicians
Ministers of Local Government and Modernisation of Norway
Bærum politicians
Norwegian jurists
University of Oslo alumni
Bredtveit concentration camp survivors
Berg concentration camp survivors
Sennheim concentration camp survivors
Buchenwald concentration camp survivors